Edward Harris (March 5, 1763 – March 28, 1813) was a United States circuit judge of the United States Circuit Court for the Fifth Circuit.

Education and career

Born on March 5, 1763, in Iredell County, Province of North Carolina, British America, Harris read law in 1791. He entered private practice in New Bern, North Carolina starting in 1791.

Federal judicial service

Harris was nominated by President Thomas Jefferson on April 27, 1802, to a seat on the United States Circuit Court for the Fifth Circuit vacated by Judge Henry Potter. He was confirmed by the United States Senate on April 29, 1802, and received his commission on May 3, 1802. His service terminated on July 1, 1802, due to abolition of the court.

Later career

Harris was a member of the North Carolina House of Commons (now the North Carolina House of Representatives) from 1802 to 1803, and in 1807. He was a Trustee for the University of North Carolina from 1805 to 1813. He was a Judge of the North Carolina Superior Court from 1811 to 1813.

Death

Harris died on March 28, 1813, in Lumberton, North Carolina.

References

1763 births
1813 deaths
19th-century American judges
Judges of the United States circuit courts
People from Iredell County, North Carolina
Politicians from New Bern, North Carolina
United States federal judges appointed by Thomas Jefferson
United States federal judges admitted to the practice of law by reading law